Võhma may refer to several places in Estonia:

Võhma, town in Viljandi County
Võhma, Ida-Viru County, village in Mäetaguse Parish, Ida-Viru County
Võhma, Lääne County, village in Lihula Parish, Lääne County
Võhma, Sõmeru Parish, village in Sõmeru Parish, Lääne-Viru County
Võhma, Vihula Parish, village in Vihula Parish, Lääne-Viru County
Võhma, Mustjala Parish, village in Mustjala Parish, Saare County
Võhma, Orissaare Parish, village in Orissaare Parish, Saare County